Pyotr Petrinich (born 20 December 1957) is a Belarusian rowing cox. He competed in the men's coxed four event at the 1992 Summer Olympics.

References

External links
 

1957 births
Living people
Soviet male rowers
Belarusian male rowers
Olympic rowers of the Unified Team
Rowers at the 1992 Summer Olympics
Sportspeople from Brest, Belarus
Coxswains (rowing)